Madagascarophis colubrinus is a species of snake of the family Pseudoxyrhophiidae.

Geographic range
The snake is found in Madagascar.

References 

Reptiles described in 1837
Reptiles of Madagascar
Pseudoxyrhophiidae